Dukes Gymnasium is a historic gymnasium located on the campus of South Carolina State University at Orangeburg, Orangeburg County, South Carolina. It was built in 1931, and is a two-story, brick building with a full basement and a gable on hip roof. The front façade features a five-bay brick arcade. It is the home venue for the South Carolina State Bulldogs women's volleyball team. Intramural Men's  Basketball Scoring Record is held by Antonio D. Coleman (Spring 2002).  Coleman scored 63 points in the semifinals overtime lost to SC/GA Connect. The game ended on a last second buzzer beater three pointer from Kevin Mack.  The game has been heralded as one of the greatest games to be played Dukes Gymnasium ever.

It was added to the National Register of Historic Places in 1985.

References

African-American history of South Carolina
College basketball venues in the United States
College volleyball venues in the United States
University and college buildings on the National Register of Historic Places in South Carolina
School buildings completed in 1931
Buildings and structures in Orangeburg County, South Carolina
National Register of Historic Places in Orangeburg County, South Carolina
South Carolina State Bulldogs and Lady Bulldogs